Alfred “Fred” Goldberg, Ph.D., (born 1942) is an American cell biologist-biochemist and professor at Harvard University. His major discoveries have concerned the mechanisms and physiological importance of protein degradation in cells. Of wide impact have been his lab's demonstration that all cells contain a pathway for selectively eliminating misfolded proteins, his discoveries about the role of proteasomes in this process and of the enzyme systems catalyzing protein breakdown in bacteria, his elucidating the mechanisms for muscle atrophy and the role of proteasomes in antigen presentation to the immune system, and his introduction of proteasome inhibitors now widely used as research tools and in the treatment of blood cancers.

Research career
In the 1960s, when Goldberg began his research career, there was extremely little interest in protein degradation. However, as a graduate student, Goldberg showed that the loss of muscle mass upon denervation or fasting occurred primarily through acceleration of protein degradation. As an Assistant Professor, he decided to focus on this neglected area, and his early studies in E. coli and reticulocytes first demonstrated that cells rapidly degrade misfolded proteins as arise through mutations and errors in protein synthesis.  These studies defined for the first time many of the key features of intracellular protein degradation, especially its role in protein quality control in eliminating aggregation-prone proteins and its requirement for metabolic energy (ATP). 

At that time, the lysosome was believed to be the only site for protein degradation in cells. However, in 1977, his lab demonstrated that the rapid breakdown of misfolded proteins in reticulocytes is catalyzed by a non-lysosomal, ATP-dependent system, now called the Ubiquitin Proteasome System. The seminal studies of Hershko, Ciechanover, and Irwin Rose on these preparations uncovered the role of ubiquitination in marking such proteins for degradation. Simultaneously, Goldberg and coworkers discovered that protein degradation in bacteria, which lack ubiquitin, and mitochondria involves a new type of enzyme, ATP hydrolyzing protease complexes (protease Lon/La, ClpAP, HslUV). They went on to describe their novel mechanisms and induction in stressful states
In 1987, his laboratory and Rechsteiner’s described the much larger ATP-dependent proteolytic complex that degrades ubiquitinated proteins in reticulocytes. He named it the 26S proteasome to distinguish it from the smaller particle, which he named the 20S proteasome, and which they later showed comprises the proteolytic activity of the 26S complex. Their subsequent studies defined many of the proteasome’s novel biochemical features, especially its ATP-dependent mechanism, peptide products, and cellular functions. Their recent research has shown that cellular rates of degradation are controlled in part by regulation of 26S proteasome activity, including by protein kinases. 

Of major scientific and medical impact was his lab’s development of proteasome inhibitors that block degradation in cells. In collaboration with a small biotech company (Myogenics/Proscript), which he founded, they introduced in 1994 the inhibitor, MG132, which has been used in many thousands of publications and has enabled major advances in knowledge about the importance of protein degradation. In introducing these inhibitors, they showed that the proteasome is the major site for protein breakdown in normal cells, is critical in activation of inflammatory responses, and is the source of most antigen peptides presented on surface MHC Class 1 molecules, which is critical in immune defense against viruses and cancer. His long collaboration with Ken Rock further elucidated this process, identified the unique properties of the proteasomes in immune tissues, and defined the roles of cellular peptidases (especially ERAP1) in further processing proteasome products so they fit into MHC Class 1 molecules. Most importantly, Goldberg’s efforts initiated the development by the company of proteasome inhibitor Bortezomib/Velcade, which is used worldwide to treat the common hematological cancer, multiple myeloma. Over 600,000 patients have now been treated with proteasome inhibits, which have extended their life spans and improved their quality of life. 

Another area where the Goldberg lab has made major contributions concerns the cellular mechanisms of muscle atrophy. His lab first identified factors that suppress muscle protein degradation (e.g., insulin) or enhance it (e.g., disuse, cancer cachexia), and subsequently showed that various types of muscle wasting occur through transcription of a common set of atrophy-related genes (atrogenes). They also identified the critical transcription factor triggering this atrophy program (FoxO3) and elucidated the mechanisms that disassemble the muscles’ contractile apparatus during atrophy.

Education and career
Goldberg was born in 1942 in Providence, RI and graduated from Harvard College in 1963 magna cum laude in Biochemical Sciences (where he did his honor’s research in the laboratory of James Watson). He then spent a year as a Churchill Scholar at Cambridge University, where he studied physiology, before becoming a medical student at Harvard. After two years, he transferred to the Harvard Graduate School and in 1968 received his PhD in Physiology for studies in the laboratory of HM Goodman. He then joined the faculty at Harvard Medical School and rose to become full Professor of Physiology in 1977 and since 1993 Professor of Cell Biology. He also held visiting professorships at University of California (Berkeley) (1976), Institut Pasteur (Paris) (1995), and Cambridge University (St. John's College) (2012).

Professional honors
Member of the American Academy of Arts & Sciences (2005)
Member of the National Academy of Medicine (2009)
Member of the National Academy of Sciences (2015)
Fellow of the American Physiological Society (2015)
Honorary DSc. Degree Watson School of Biology (Cold Spring Harbor Laboratory) (2009)
Honorary DSc. Degree Maastricht University (Netherlands)  (2011)
Honorary DSc. Degree University of Barcelona (Spain) (2014)
Novartis-Drew University Award in Biochemical Science (with T. Maniatis & A. Varshavsky) (1998)
Knobil Prize for Medical Research (Univ Texas School of Medicine, 2007)
Gabbay Award for Biotechnology & Medicine (Brandeis University, 2008)
Warren Alpert Foundation Prize, Harvard Medical School (with J. Adams, K. Anderson, P. Richardson) (2012)
Ernest Beutler Prize for Basic Science, American Society of Hematology (2015)
Passano Prize for Medical Research (Johns Hopkins University, 2021)
Symposium honoring Dr. Goldberg’s “Pioneering contributions to muscle metabolism”, Cachexia Society (Chicago, 2004) 
Symposium on “Protein Modification and Degradation” honoring Dr. Goldberg’s 65th Birthday, Chinese Academy of Medical Sciences (Beijing, 2007)

Prize Lectureships
Francis McNaughton Lecture, McGill University-Montreal-Neurological Institute (1997)
Bathsheva Rothchild Memorial Lecture, Israel Academy of Sciences (1998)
Leonardo da Vinci Lecture, San Raffaelle Med School, Milan, Italy (2002) 
Fred Fay Memorial Lecture, University of Massachusetts Medical School (2003)
Severo Ochoa Prize Lecture, New York University (2004)
Nobel Forum Lecture, Karolinska Institute (Sweden) (2005)
Centennial Lecture, Biochemical Society, England (2006)
Cristofalo Prize Lecture, Aging Institute (University of Pennsylvania) (2015) 
Benevuto Prize Lecture, MD Anderson Cancer Center Univ. Texas Medical Center (Houston) (2019)

Family
Since 1970, Prof Goldberg has been married to Dr. Joan Helpern Goldberg, a physician (hematologist). They have two children, Aaron Goldberg, a well-known jazz pianist, and Julie B. Goldberg, a software engineer.

Influential publications
Goldberg AL. Degradation of abnormal proteins in Escherichia coli (protein breakdown-protein structure-mistranslation-amino acid analogs-puromycin). Proc Natl Acad Sci U S A. 1972 Feb;69(2):422-6. PubMed PMID: 4551144; PubMed Central PMCID: PMC426471.
Prouty WF, Goldberg AL. Fate of abnormal proteins in E. coli accumulation in intracellular granules before catabolism. Nat New Biol. 1972 Nov 29;240(100):147-50. PubMed PMID: 4565695.
Goldberg AL, St John AC. Intracellular protein degradation in mammalian and bacterial cells: Part 2. Annu Rev Biochem. 1976;45:747-803. PubMed PMID: 786161.
Goldberg AL and Dice JF. Intracellular protein degradation in mammalian and bacterial cells. Ann Rev Biochem 1974; 43: 835-869. PubMed PMID: 4604628.
Goldberg AL. Protein degradation and protection against misfolded or damaged proteins. Nature. 2003 Dec 18;426(6968):895-9. PubMed PMID: 14685250.
Etlinger JD, Goldberg AL. A soluble ATP-dependent proteolytic system responsible for the degradation of abnormal proteins in reticulocytes. Proc Natl Acad Sci U S A. 1977 Jan;74(1):54-8. PubMed PMID: 264694; PubMed Central PMCID: PMC393195.
Chung CH, Goldberg AL. The product of the lon (capR) gene in Escherichia coli is the ATP-dependent protease, protease La. Proc Natl Acad Sci U S A. 1981 Aug;78(8):4931-5. PubMed PMID: 6458037; PubMed Central PMCID: PMC320299.
Tanaka K, Waxman L and Goldberg AL. ATP serves two distinct roles in protein degradation in reticulocytes, one requiring and one independent of ubiquitin. J Cell Biol 1983; 96: 1580-1585.
Goff SA and Goldberg AL. Production of abnormal proteins in E. coli stimulates transcription of lon and other heat-shock genes. Cell 1985; 41: 587-595. PubMed PMID: 3886165.
Waxman L, Fagan JM, Goldberg AL. Demonstration of two distinct high molecular weight proteases in rabbit reticulocytes, one of which degrades ubiquitin conjugates. J Biol Chem. 1987 Feb 25;262(6):2451-7. PubMed PMID: 3029081.
Hwang BJ, Park WJ, Chung CH, Goldberg AL. Escherichia coli contains a soluble ATP-dependent protease (Ti) distinct from protease La. Proc Natl Acad Sci U S A. 1987 Aug;84(16):5550-4. PubMed PMID: 3303028; PubMed Central PMCID: PMC298900.
Gaczynska M, Rock KL, Goldberg AL. Gamma-interferon and expression of MHC genes regulate peptide hydrolysis by proteasomes. Nature. 1993 Sep 16;365(6443):264-7. PubMed PMID: 8396732.
Rock KL, Gramm C, Rothstein L, Clark K, Stein R, et al…Goldberg AL. Inhibitors of the proteasome block the degradation of most cell proteins and the generation of peptides presented on MHC class I molecules. Cell. 1994 Sep 9;78(5):761-71. PubMed PMID: 8087844.
Palombella VJ, Rando OJ, Goldberg AL and Maniatis T. The ubiquitin- proteasome pathway is required for processing the NFkB1 precursor protein and the activation of NF-kB. Cell 1994; 78: 773-785.  
Goldberg AL, Gaczynska M, Grant E, Michalek M, Rock KL. Functions of the proteasome in antigen presentation. Cold Spring Harb Symp Quant Biol. 1995;60:479-90. PubMed PMID: 8824421.
Rock KL, Goldberg AL. Degradation of cell proteins and the generation of MHC class I-presented peptides. Annu Rev Immunol. 1999; 17: 739-79
Goldberg AL. Development of proteasome inhibitors as research tools and cancer drugs. J Cell Biol. 2012 Nov 12;199(4):583-8. PubMed PMID: 23148232; PubMed Central PMCID: PMC3494858.
Coux O, Tanaka K, Goldberg AL. Structure and functions of the 20S and 26S proteasomes. Annu Rev Biochem. 1996;65:801-47. PubMed PMID: 8811196.
Smith DM, Chang SC, Park S, Finley D, Cheng Y, et al. Docking of the proteasomal ATPases' carboxyl termini in the 20S proteasome's alpha ring opens the gate for substrate entry. Mol Cell. 2007 Sep 7;27(5):731-44. PubMed PMID: 17803938; PubMed Central PMCID: PMC2083707.
Smith DM, Fraga H, Reis C, Kafri G, Goldberg AL. ATP binds to proteasomal ATPases in pairs with distinct functional effects, implying an ordered reaction cycle. Cell. 2011 Feb 18;144(4):526-38. PubMed PMID: 21335235; PubMed Central PMCID: PMC3063399.
Mitch WE, Goldberg AL. Mechanisms of muscle wasting. The role of the ubiquitin-proteasome pathway. N Engl J Med. 1996 Dec 19;335(25):1897-905. PubMed PMID: 8948566.
Lecker SH, Jagoe RT, Gilbert A, Gomes M, Baracos V, et al. Multiple types of skeletal muscle atrophy involve a common program of changes in gene expression. FASEB J. 2004 Jan;18(1):39-51. PubMed PMID: 14718385.
Sandri M, Sandri C, Gilbert A, Skurk C, Calabria E, et al. Foxo transcription factors induce the atrophy-related ubiquitin ligase atrogin-1 and cause skeletal muscle atrophy. Cell. 2004 Apr 30;117(3):399-412. PubMed PMID: 15109499; PubMed Central PMCID: PMC3619734.
Cohen S, Nathan JA, Goldberg AL. Muscle wasting in disease: molecular mechanisms and promising therapies. Nat Rev Drug Discov. 2015 Jan;14(1):58-74. PubMed PMID: 25549588.
Lokireddy, S, Kukushkin, NV, and Goldberg, AL. cAMP-induced phosphorylation of the 26S proteasome enhances its function and the degradation of misfolded proteins. Proc Natl Acad Sci USA. 2015 Dec 29; 112(52): E716-85. Doi 10.1073. PubMed PMID: 1522332112.
VerPlank J, Lokireddy S, Zhao J, Goldberg AL. 26S Proteasomes are rapidly activated by diverse hormones and physiological states that raise cAMP and cause Rpn6 phosphorylation. Proc Natl Acad Sci U S A. 2019. doi:10.1073/pnas.1809254116. PMID: 30782827.
VerPlank JJS, Tyrkalska SD, Fleming A, Rubinsztein DC, Goldberg AL. cGMP via PKG activates 26S proteasomes and enhances degradation of proteins, including ones that cause neurodegenerative diseases. Proc Natl Acad Sci U S A. 2020;117(25):14220-14230. doi:10.1073/pnas.2003277117. PMID: 32513741.

References 

Harvard Medical School faculty
Harvard College alumni
Alumni of the University of Cambridge
1942 births
Living people
Members of the National Academy of Medicine